C.P.L. Public Inter College is a Hindi and English-medium co-educational school in Nagram, Gosainganj, Lucknow, Uttar Pradesh, India. It was established in 2003 by a farmer, Pyare Lal Verma. It currently has more than 30 teachers, and teaches students from kindergarten to class XII.

The school is affiliated to the U.P. Board, Council for the Indian School Certificate Examination , Central Board of Secondary Education, New Delhi, and certified under the Government of Uttar Pradesh and Government of India. The Director of this college is Mr. Virendra Kumar Verma. The Age range for admission starts with 3 years minimum. 

Core subjects include:
Languages - English (compulsory), Hindi (compulsory) and Sanskrit,
Mathematics,
Science (Physics, Chemistry and Biology),
Social Studies (History, Civics, Geography),
Computer Science,
Book Craft, Art/Drawing, General Knowledge.

Subjects offered in classes XI - XII include:
Science Stream
Compulsory five subjects including two languages. 
English,
Physics,
Chemistry,
Mathematics / Biology/ Hindi

External links 

Private schools in Uttar Pradesh
Primary schools in Uttar Pradesh
High schools and secondary schools in Uttar Pradesh
Intermediate colleges in Uttar Pradesh
Private schools in Lucknow
Schools in Lucknow
Educational institutions established in 2003
2003 establishments in Uttar Pradesh